Amarante do Maranhão is a municipality in the state of Maranhão in the Northeast region of Brazil.

There are approximately 600 speakers of Pykobjê in Terra Indígena Governador, located close to the town of Amarante.

See also
List of municipalities in Maranhão

References

Municipalities in Maranhão